Las Moras Creek, a stream in Kinney and Maverick Counties in Texas. It runs south southwest for forty miles, through Las Moras Springs at Brackettville, to its mouth at its confluence with the Rio Grande, five miles northwest of Quemado in Maverick County.

History
The San Antonio-El Paso Road crossed Las Moras Creek at Las Moras Springs, where Fort Clark would be established to guard the route. Later Brackettville would be founded north of the fort on the creek.

See also
List of rivers of Texas

References

Tributaries of the Rio Grande
Bodies of water of Maverick County, Texas
Rivers of Kinney County, Texas
San Antonio–El Paso Road
Rivers of Texas